These are the official results of the Women's 200 metres event at the 1980 Summer Olympics in Moscow. The competition was held on July 28, 1980, and on July 30, 1980.

Results

Final
Held on Wednesday July 30, 1980.

Semifinals
Held on Wednesday July 30, 1980

Quarterfinals
Held on Monday July 28, 1980.

Heats
Held on Monday July 28, 1980.

Qualification rule: First 3 in each heat (Q) and the next 6 fastest (q) advance to the quarterfinals.

See also
 1976 Women's Olympic 200 metres (Montreal)
 1978 Women's European Championships 200 metres (Prague)
 1982 Women's European Championships 200 metres (Athens)
 1983 Women's World Championships 200 metres (Helsinki)
 1984 Women's Olympic 200 metres (Los Angeles)

References

External links
Results

 2
200 metres at the Olympics
1980 in women's athletics
Women's events at the 1980 Summer Olympics